The inferior petrosal sinuses are two small sinuses situated on the inferior border of the petrous part of the temporal bone, one on each side. Each inferior petrosal sinus drains the cavernous sinus into the internal jugular vein.

Structure 
The inferior petrosal sinus is situated in the inferior petrosal sulcus, formed by the junction of the petrous part of the temporal bone with the basilar part of the occipital bone. It begins below and behind the cavernous sinus and, passing through the anterior part of the jugular foramen, ends in the superior bulb of the internal jugular vein.

Function 
The inferior petrosal sinus receives the internal auditory veins and also veins from the medulla oblongata, pons, and under surface of the cerebellum.

Additional images

See also
 Dural venous sinuses
 Inferior petrosal sinus sampling

References
 

Veins of the head and neck